Secernosaurus (meaning "severed lizard") is a genus of herbivorous dinosaur. Secernosaurus was a hadrosaur, a "duck-billed" dinosaur which lived during the Late Cretaceous.

Secernosaurus and its close relatives lived in South America, unlike most hadrosaurs, which lived in the Laurasian continents of Eurasia and North America. It has been suggested that the ancestors of Secernosaurus crossed into South America when a land bridge temporarily formed between North and South America during the Late Cretaceous and allowed biotic interchange between the two continents.

History of research
The holotype of Secernosaurus koeneri was collected in 1923 as part of an expedition by the Field Museum led by J. B. Abbott. However, the specimen was not studied until the 1970s. In 1979, Brett-Surman named Secernosaurus. Though hadrosaurid specimens from South America had been described before, Secernosaurus koeneri was the first species of South American hadrosaurid to be formally named. The genus name Secernosaurus means "separated reptile" and comes from the Latin verb sēcernō, meaning to sever or divide, in reference to its geographic location separated from Laurasian hadrosaurs. The species name S. koerneri honors Harold E. Koerner. The holotype of Secernosaurus koerneri is FMNH P13423, a partial skeleton from the Lago Colhué Huapi Formation of Chubut province, Argentina.

In 2010, Albert Prieto-Marquez and Guillermo Salinas argued that Kritosaurus australis was synonymous with Secernosaurus koeneri. However, in 2015, Rodolfo Coria noted differences between the two, and suggested their taxonomy needed reevaluation. In 2022, the two species were recognized as separate and the genus Huallasaurus was established for Kritosaurus australis.

Description
Secernosaurus may have been small for a hadrosaurid. The type specimen pertains to an individual approximately 5 m long, but the maturity of the specimen is uncertain.

Classification

Phylogenetic analyses have found Secernosaurus to be part of a tribe of hadrosaurid dinosaurs known as Kritosaurini, within the subfamily Saurolophinae. North American animals such as Kritosaurus and Gryposaurus are also part of this clade. Specifically, within Kritosaurini, a 2022 paper by Sebastián Rozadilla and colleagues describing fossil material of South American hadrosaurs found those from the continent to all group together within a single clade, including Secernosaurus, Huallasaurus, Kelumapusaura, and Bonapartesaurus. The results of phylogenetic analysis of that study, modified from that of a 2020 study by Ryuji Takasaki and colleagues, is shown below:

Palaeoecology

Palaeoenvironment

The geologic layers of the Lago Colhué Huapi Formation, where Scernosaurus hails from, have proved difficult to interpret historically, their assignment shifting around between several different geologic formations before finally being settled as its own unit of the Chubut Group, dating to the Maastrichtian. Additionally, Secernosaurus specifically had a very uncertain geologic provenance. Resultingly, the ecosystem Secernosaurus would've lived in was not strongly understood historically. A 2016 paper by Casal A. Gabriel and colleagues studied the climatic conditions of the region more in depth, finding evidence of climate change across geologic time. Fluvial systems and evidence of a floodplain environment were recognized, but the geologically lower parts of the formation also showed evidence of semi-arid conditions, large gypsum deposits, and desiccation cracks, indicating intense aridization of the region compared to the very humid climate of the Bajo Barreal Formation's ecosystem that preceded Lago Colhué Huapi Formation. However, palynological data indicates that during the upper deposits of the formation at the very end of the Cretaceous and into the Danian age of the Paleocene, the climate become more mild once again and returned to a balance wet and dry season. It is from this uppermost part of the formation that Secernosaurus it from. More recent discoveries of hadrosaur remains from other localities, which could belong to Secernosaurus might extend the range within the formation hadrosaurs are found in. Currently, however, they have not been research in depth.

Secernosaurus is not the only dinosaur known from Lago Colhué Huapi. Remains of the sauropods Elaltitan lilloi, Argyrosaurus superbus and Aeolosaurus colhuehuapensis, as well as unidentified sauropod remains found in 2010, have been discovered in the formation. Very fragmentary remains of dromaeosaurid and megaraptoran theropods have also been discovered, as is expected from other formations from a similar time and place. The enigmatic ornithischian dinosaur Notoceratops, based on a lost fragmentary specimen originally considered to belong to a ceratopsian but now debated between that identity and that of a hadrosaur. Finally, scant fossils of chelonians, crocodyliformes, and dipnoid fish have also been found.

Palaeobiogeography
Secernosaurus lived in what is now Patagonia during the Maastrichtian age of the Cretaceous period. It was one of the few hadrosaurs to live in South America. Their presence in South America is likely to represent a dispersal event from North America during the Campanian, when the proto-Antilles may have formed an island chain that allowed land vertebrates to cross between the two continents. The arrival of hadrosaurids in South America may have caused the decline of the native ornithopods, the elasmarians.

See also 
 Timeline of hadrosaur research
 Alamosaurus – a titanosaur whose ancestors may have crossed into North America at the same time the ancestors of Secernosaurus crossed into South America
 Huallasaurus
 Kritosaurus

References 

Saurolophines
Maastrichtian life
Late Cretaceous dinosaurs of South America
Cretaceous Argentina
Fossils of Argentina
Los Alamitos Formation
Golfo San Jorge Basin
Fossil taxa described in 1979
Ornithischian genera